Perozes (from Middle Persian Pērōz) was the Sassanid Persian general opposing the Byzantines under Belisarius at the Battle of Dara (530).

According to the description of the Byzantine historian Procopius of Caesarea, he was "a Persian, whose title was "mirranes" (for thus the Persians designate this office), Perozes by name". Mirranes however probably refers not to an office, but to the House of Mihran, one of the seven great noble clans of the Sassanid Empire. After his defeat at Dara, he was disgraced by the Persian shah Kavadh I. Nothing else is known of his life. He may however be identical to the mirranes who according to Procopius tried to lay siege to Dara during the Anastasian War.

References

Sources

6th-century Iranian people
Generals of Kavad I
People of the Roman–Sasanian Wars
House of Mihran
Iberian War
Anastasian War